is a Japanese manga series conceptualized by Mikoto Yamaguchi and written and illustrated by Yuki Sato. It has been serialized in Kodansha's Bessatsu Shōnen Magazine since December 2013. A television drama adaptation and two live-action films premiered in 2017. An anime television series adaptation by Okuruto Noboru aired from April to June 2022. A second television drama adaptation titled Tomodachi Game R4 premiered on TV Asahi in July 2022.

Premise
Yūichi Katagiri was taught the value of friendship when he was young, and it is thanks to his group of four friends that he is able to enjoy high school life today. When their class's school trip funds are stolen, the five are dragged into the mysterious Tomodachi Game as a result of someone's debt. The friendship of the five will be put to the ultimate test against the promise of wealth there.

Characters

Group C

A seemingly normal high school boy from a poor family background. Like the rest of his friends, he was called out to participate in Tomodachi Game and has his trust in his friends put to the test. As the Game progresses, Yūichi is revealed to possess a vastly different side to himself: one that is ruthless, skilfully manipulative and merciless to his enemies, having an uncanny knack for decoding rules and people's essences. It is also hinted that he has a dark and bloody past, confirmed to have killed at least three people, two of them revealed to be his adopted parents. He opts to participate in the Adult Tomodachi Game and destroy its administration, even though later it was revealed that he was the one to came up with the idea of Tomodachi Game as a child, leading to its creation.

One of Yūichi's friends who participates in Tomodachi Game alongside them. Owing to her policeman father, she was brought up with a strong sense of morality and righteousness, which makes her well-liked among her peers. She has a crush on Yūichi. Because she had accidentally lost their class's trip funds, she earned the ire of her classmates and inadvertently paid the admission fee for their Tomodachi Game. Following her, Shibe and Kokorogi's release from the second round, she and Shibe are bullied by their classmates out of suspicion and hatred, leading up to her disappearance. She reappears again on the administrators' side as a hostage due to her father looking into the Tomodachi Game while discovering the two traitors in her group. She later rejoins as a participant for Game #2.2 Friend's Battle Royale, as a replacement for Kei, then fully participates in the final Game #3 Friendless Game to find the real truth behind the Tomodachi Game while also finally learning about Yuichi's past.

 
One of Yūichi's friends who participates in Tomodachi Game alongside them. He is calm, reserved and brilliant, often taking the top place in school and is highly capable of negotiation and mediation. It is revealed that he had participated in Tomodachi Game before, accumulating debt from his past friends' betrayal that was brought to the current Game. He originally bores a great hatred for Shiho, his childhood friend, who supposedly resulted in his past friends' betrayal and his father's death, subsequently stalking her and intending to use the current Game to demoralize her completely. However upon learning the truth behind his father's death, his relationship with Sawaragi is restored. Upon the end of the second round, he accompanies Yūichi for the rest of the Games, winning his trust.

One of Yūichi's friends who participates in Tomodachi Game alongside them. He is the son of a politician, which allowed him to grow up without worry over money, and has a carefree and honest personality. He has a crush on Shiho. Following his, Shiho and Kokorogi's release from the second round, he and Shiho are bullied by their classmates out of suspicion and hatred. When he asks for money from his father, he winds up getting accused of murdering him and attempted sexual assault on Shiho while becoming a part of Yūichi, Tenji and Kokorogi's third round challenge to prove his innocence for stealing the class trip funds. Despite having his name cleared, Shibe inherits his father's debt and follows Yūichi in participating in the Adult Tomodachi Game. However he later learns that Yūichi was the reason his father earned the debt by using his money to pay Taizen to keep Yūichi behaving for the sake of a sickly Yuka who he has feeling for back in high school and turned him into the corrupted politician he currently is, which cause him to work with Kokorogi and Shinji and betray Yuichi.

One of Yūichi's friends who participates in Tomodachi Game alongside them. She is described as kind, timid and highly gullible, as well as possessing a very seductive figure and a genuine interest in manga. Following her, Shibe and Shiho's release from the second round, she joins Yūichi and Tenji in all the games onwards. In the past, Kokorogi faced extreme bullying and apparently "worked as a prostitute," though she never conducted night service. It is revealed that she has another, far more cunning and wicked side to her and secret dealings with figures from Yūichi's past, it is also revealed she and Yūichi met before they meet each other in high school. She was also the one responsible for the murder of Mikasa's father so that she can frame Sawaragi as part of her plan to drag everyone to the Tomodachi Game.

Tomodachi Game Administration

Administrators and Observers

She joins the third game under the guise of having advanced to this stage alone but joins Group C. In truth, she is one of the administrators of the Tomodachi Game, sent to spy on Yuichi. A very cheery and sly girl, Maria is in charge of observing Yuichi and hindering other participants in various games when needed. She later develops a crush on Yuichi finding his face and personality when he is ruthless and merciless charming.

A buxom administrator with short, blue hair covering the right half of her face. Usually in charge of observing Yuichi.

A buxom administrator with long, blonde hair. Initially introduced as the administrator in charge of observing Group K for Game #3: Friendly Hide and Seek, but is usually in charge of monitoring Kei Shinomiya specifically. Nicknamed "Tama-chan" by those close to her.

Manabu Variants

A mascot character from a popular in-universe anime series, Manabu-kun is the host to the various games, and usually dresses up in disguises to fit the game's theme. He will introduce the games, explain the rules and whatever else this particular game requires. However, he never directly interferes with the players unless necessary.

Manabu's disguise for Tomodachi Game #2: Kageguchi Sugoroku.

Tomodachi Game Participants

Group K

The shortest member of Group K, he seems to be the most innocent of the group. However, he was the real mastermind behind Group K's near-victory in Hide-and-Seek. A genius that even rivals Yuichi, he joined the Adult Tomodachi Game in hopes of going toe-to-toe with Yuichi and beating him at his mind games. After getting bested by Yuichi in Friend's Prison, he joined his team – in place of Shiho – and after gaining the trust of his teammates, Yuichi acknowledged Kei as a comrade, and they both assisted each other during All-Bet Gambling.

The leader of Group K who volunteers to be the hider during Friendly Hide and Seek. After dropping out of school and helping his family business, he applied his team to the Tomodachi Game for the last chance at winning the national high-school basketball tournament due to the huge debt incurred. Following the conclusion of Game #3, he was supposed to participate in the Adult Tomodachi Game #1: Friend's Prison, but Shinomiya implied that he "disappeared." It is later revealed that Kadokura is alive, but Shinomiya took his place for the participation in Adult Tomodachi Game.

The hothead of Group K who has a very kind heart, is also quick to violence. 

The playboy of Group K. Usually in charge of keeping Hyakutaro in check if he becomes emotional.

The quiet member of Group K.

Adult Tomodachi Game Participants

Game #1: Friend's Prison

A thug who kidnapped Yutori and incited Yuichi to rescue her under the guise of a Tomodachi Game. After being threatened by Yuichi and subsequently arrested for posing as an administrator, Kuroki joined the Adult Tomodachi Game hoping to get revenge on Yuichi. Later, it is revealed that Yutori orchestrated her kidnapping and asked Kuroki to do so. His first name is presumably , according to his ex-girlfriend Minami.

A former host club and a playboy participating in the Friend's Prison game. He also cleared Tomodachi Game twice.

Kuroki's ex-girlfriend and participant.

A former Housekeeper of the Shibe Household who was forced to work for unknown reasons, she bore a great hatred to the Shibe family. She became the first witness during Shibe's trial game to vent her anger, but later regains Shibe's trust and faith and later become a ally to Yuichi during the prison game. It was also revealed she was Shibe's first love that inspire him to like the "big sister types".

Game #2.1: All-Bet Gambling

Team Kamishiro

The son of Taizen Shiba and Yuichi's adoptive older brother with a shady business who first appeared as an assistant to Kamishiro in the Gambling games. Raised by the same person who taught Yuichi, it was known he could be the strongest and the same level of genius as his own brother. It was known that he worked with Kokorogi at the past manipulating several events with her; which includes Sawaragi's capture in middle school, and the murder of Mikasa's father. It also implied that he was responsible for Sawaragi's large scar on her chest.

The eldery leader of the Kamishiro Team who claims to have the "God Eye" for being able to see through the opponents trick.

Team Kaidou

A detective who infiltrated Tomodachi Game to investigate by participating with his group and daughter. He later works with Yuichi to end Tomodachi Game. 

The daughter of Tsukasa Kaidou who has extraordinary senses.

Team Mishima

Game #2.2: Friends Murder Game

Game #3: Friendless Game

Others

The father of Shinji Shiba and the adoptive father of Yuichi who was the one who taught him about the value of money over the world. He was revealed to be one of the three people Yuichi killed at the past.

Yuichi's adoptive mother who raised him to be a better person and taught him the value of friends over money. She was revealed to be one of the three people Yuichi killed at the past. But unlike with Taizen, Yuichi felt heavily remorse when killing Yuka.

Media

Manga
Tomodachi Game, conceptualized by Mikoto Yamaguchi and written and illustrated by Yuki Sato, started in Kodansha's Bessatsu Shōnen Magazine on December 9, 2013. Kodansha has collected its chapters into individual tankōbon volumes. The first volume was released on April 9, 2014. As of October 7, 2022, twenty-one volumes have been released.

Volume list

Drama
A four-episode television drama adaptation was broadcast on Chiba TV from April 3–24, 2017. It also aired on Teletama, Hokkaido TV, tvk, Kyushu Asahi Broadcasting, Sun TV, KBS Kyoto, and Mētele and was streamed on GYAO!. It was directed by Jiro Nagae, with screenplays by Nagae and Sagami Yoshitsugu, and Kuniyuki Morohashi composing the music.

In June 2022, another television drama adaptation produced by TV Asahi, titled Tomodachi Game R4, was announced. It was directed by Takurо̄ Oikawa, Hajime Takezono, and Toshiaki Kamada, with screenplays by Takuji Higuchi and Shinya Hokimoto, and Yoshinori Nakamura composing the music. The series features members of the Johnny's Jr. boybands, HiHi Jets and Bishonen as cast members. It was broadcast for eight episodes on TV Asahi from July 23 to September 10, 2022.

Live-action films

Anime
In November 2021, it was announced that the series would receive an anime television series adaptation by Okuruto Noboru. It is directed by Hirofumi Ogura and written by Kenta Ihara, with Satomi Miyazaki designing the characters, Michiru composing the music, and Hiroto Morishita directing the sound at Studio Mausu. The series aired from April 6 to June 22, 2022, on NTV, BS NTV, and AT-X. The opening theme song is "Double Shuffle" by Nana Mizuki, while the ending theme song is "Tomoshibi" by saji. Crunchyroll licensed the series outside of Asia. Medialink licensed the series in Southeast Asia and began streaming it exclusively on Disney+/Disney+ Hotstar in Indonesia, Malaysia, and Thailand from May 13, 2022; Hong Kong, Taiwan, and Singapore on June 8, 2022.

An English dub by Crunchyroll premiered on April 19, 2022.

Episode list

See also
Dead Tube, another manga series written by Mikoto Yamaguchi
Who Wants to Marry a Billionaire?, another manga series written by Mikoto Yamaguchi

Notes

References

External links
 
 
 

2017 Japanese television series debuts
2017 Japanese television series endings
2022 anime television series debuts
2022 Japanese television series debuts
Anime series based on manga
Crunchyroll anime
Kodansha manga
Live-action films based on manga
Manga adapted into films
Manga adapted into television series
Medialink
Nippon TV original programming
Okuruto Noboru
Psychological thriller anime and manga
Shōnen manga
TV Asahi television dramas
Hulu Japan
Japanese psychological thriller films